The 1917 Arkansas Razorbacks football team represented the University of Arkansas in the Southwest Conference (SWC) during the 1917 college football season. In their first year under head coach Norman C. Paine, the Razorbacks compiled a 5–1–1 record (0–1–1 against SWC opponents), finished in last place in the SWC, and outscored their opponents by a combined total of 118 to 27.

Schedule

References

Arkansas
Arkansas Razorbacks football seasons
Arkansas Razorbacks football